Amadea Palaiologina of Monferrato (1418–1440), was a queen consort of Cyprus, wife of king John II of Cyprus.

Amadea was the daughter of John Jacob, Marquess of Montferrat and Joanna of Savoy, daughter of Amadeus VII, Count of Savoy.

On 3 July 1440,  Amadea was married to John II of Cyprus, son of Janus of Cyprus and the second wife Charlotte of Bourbon and crowned queen.  The wedding was celebrated by proxy in 1437, the bride arrived in Cyprus in June 1440. The marriage was the result of interest in the Eastern Mediterranean Paleologi.

Upon the marriage by proxy in 1437, Amedea became queen consort of Cyprus, Jerusalem and Armenia. The coronation took place in the church of Hagia Sophia in Nicosia on 3 July 1440.

Amadea was queen consort only for a short duration; she died suddenly two months after the marriage, she had no children.  She was buried beside Queen Charlotte in the convent of San Domenico.

The king, who needed an heir to the throne, married less than two years later to Helena Palaiologina, who bore a daughter Charlotte of Cyprus.

References

Cypriot queens consort
1429 births
1440 deaths
15th-century Cypriot people
Palaiologos dynasty
Burials in Cyprus